The 2012 Men's Junior South American Volleyball Championship was the 21st edition of the tournament, organised by South America's governing volleyball body, the Confederación Sudamericana de Voleibol (CSV). It was determined September, 2012 that Saquarema, Brazil would be the host after Cali, Colombia withdrew. The top three teams will qualify for the 2013 Junior World Championship.

Competing nations
The following national teams will participate in the tournament, teams were seeded according to how they finished in the previous edition of the tournament:

First round
''All times are Brazilian Daylight Saving Time (UTC−02:00)

Pool A

Pool B

Final round

5th to 8th places bracket

Championship bracket

Classification 5th to 7th

Semifinals

5th place match

3rd place match

Final

Final standing

Individual awards

Most Valuable Player

Best Spiker

Best Blocker

Best Server

Best Digger

Best Setter

Best Receiver

Best Libero

References

External links
CSV official website

Men's South American Volleyball Championships
S
Volleyball
V
Men's Junior South American Volleyball Championship